Tandyr nan is a type of Central Asian bread. It is often decorated by stamping patterns on the dough by using a bread stamp known as a chekich.

Names 
 Kazakh, Kyrgyz, Tajik: nan, tandyr nan
 Turkmen: 
 Uyghur: nan, tonur nan
 Uzbek: , 
 Chinese: náng
 Russian: lepyoshka

Varieties

Obi non 
Obi non or lepyoshka ("flatbread"), is a kind of flatbread in Afghan, Tajik and Uzbek cuisine. It is shaped like a disc and thicker than naan. Obi non are baked in clay ovens called tandyr.

Tohax 
Tohax, also known as toqach or toghach, is a type of tandoor bread consumed within the Xinjiang Uyghur Autonomous Region of China, as well as in many regions of Central Asia (Kazakhstan, Kyrgyzstan, Uzbekistan).

Gallery

See also 
 Bazlama
 Matnakash
 Naan
 Taftan
 Tonis puri
 Taboon bread
 Tandoori roti

References 

Afghan cuisine
Chinese breads
Flatbreads
Jewish cuisine
Kazakhstani cuisine
Kyrgyz cuisine
Soviet cuisine
Tajik cuisine
Uyghur cuisine
Uzbek dishes